Tadekho Hill is an isolated hill in the Northern Interior of British Columbia, Canada, located  southwest of Tatogga and  southwest of Kitsu Peak. It lies at the southwestern end of Mount Edziza Provincial Park.

History
Tadekho Hill was named on 2 January 1980 by the Geological Survey of Canada in association with Tadekho Creek.

Geology
Tadekho Hill is a volcanic feature associated with the Spectrum Range volcanic complex which in turn form part of the Northern Cordilleran Volcanic Province. It is a subglacial mound that formed in the Pleistocene period.

See also
 List of volcanoes in Canada
 List of Northern Cordilleran volcanoes
 Volcanism of Canada
 Volcanism of Western Canada

References

Mount Edziza volcanic complex
One-thousanders of British Columbia
Pleistocene volcanoes
Monogenetic volcanoes